Hey Boy, also known as No Stealing and Guagilo, is a 1948 Italian drama film directed by Luigi Comencini and starring Adolfo Celi. A missionary on his way to Africa has his suitcase stolen in Naples. While trying to locate it, he comes to realise the suffering and poverty in the city, and decides his work is needed there.

Cast
 Carlo Barbieri
 Adolfo Celi as Don Pietro
 Antonio Cirelli
 Carlo Della Posta
 Luigi Demastro
 Clemente De Michele
 Luigi Dermasti
 Il Duca di Civitelli
 Ettore G. Mattia as himself
 Tina Pica as Maddalena, la cuoca
 Giovanni Rinaldi
 Mario Russo as Peppinello

References

External links
 

1948 films
1948 drama films
Films scored by Nino Rota
1940s Italian-language films
Italian black-and-white films
Films directed by Luigi Comencini
Films produced by Carlo Ponti
Films set in Naples
Italian drama films
1940s Italian films